The Women's skeet event at the 2018 Commonwealth Games are being held on 8 April at the Belmont Shooting Centre, Brisbane. There will be a qualification round to determine the final participants.

Results

Qualification

Final

References

Womens skeet